Kanto is a supervillain and extraterrestrial assassin published by DC Comics.

Publication history
He first appeared in Mister Miracle #7 (March/April 1972), and was created by Jack Kirby. Kanto was allegedly modeled after Renaissance nobleman Cesare Borgia, but his appearance was "patterned after Errol Flynn in a film still".

Fictional character biography
As a student of Granny Goodness's on Apokolips, Iluthin, Kanto's name at the time, is accused of stealing weaponry from Darkseid's then-master assassin Kanto 13 and others. Iluthin is punished, not for the stealing, but being caught. He first faces a gauntlet of fellow students, defeating them with ease.

Against the wishes of Kanto 13, Iluthin is exiled from Apokolips to Renaissance-era Earth by Darkseid. There he trains under Italian teachers and falls in love with a woman named Claudia. Kanto 13 tracks Iluthin to Earth and kills Claudia at the couple's wedding altar. Iluthin defeats Kanto 13 in battle. Darkseid comes to Earth and destroys Kanto 13 for his failure. Iluthin returns to Apokolips as Darkseid's new assassin.

When Mister Miracle returns to Apokolips, he faces Kanto who captures him, taking him to Granny Goodness. Kanto dresses in a quasi-Renaissance fashion, possibly to imply both the artistic pride that he has in his assassin's work and the presence of royal court intrigue. Perhaps this attire fuels his nihilism by reminding him of his murdered love. Of all the foes Mr. Miracle faced during Kirby's run with the character, Kanto harbors a sort of professional respect with Mr. Miracle.

During writer John Byrne's Genesis comic mini-series, Kanto encounters Artemis of Bana-Mighdall, the one-time Wonder Woman, and is revealed that Kanto had been not only her teacher but a lover as well. As Artemis was trapped in a demon dimension alongside her Amazonian sisters from age fourteen to twenty-four and was not shown with Kanto until the Genesis storyline, speculation about this alleged affair suggests time travel. While mutually amorous, the tryst was apparently unconsummated since Artemis, during Mike Deodato's Requiem mini-series, claimed to be a virgin.

When New Gods are being slaughtered across the galaxy, Kanto is recalled to Apokolips where he faithfully serves Darkseid's, voicing private concerns with Granny Goodness. He is killed by Infinity-Man while spying on Orion, Mister Miracle, and Superman. His body is found by Kalibak.

During the Final Crisis storyline, Kanto has since appeared serving Darkseid, going by Boss Dark Side at the time, and Kalibak. The three inhabit human hosts posing as businessmen in the Dark Side company and brainwash gifted Earth children. It is suggested that their host bodies burn out easily.

New 52
In his New 52 version, Kanto had an affair with Leonardo da Vinci during his stay in Renaissance Italy.
Kanto is one of many responsible for training the KGBeast.

Powers and abilities
As a member of the New Gods, Kanto is functionally immortal, possesses incredible physical attributes such as superhuman strength, stamina, speed and reflexes. Kanto is strong enough to lift about 50 tons, his reflexes and speed allow him to dodge bullets, lasers, etc. Kanto has a high level of invulnerability (he survived a fall into Apokolips's fire pits), does not fatigue, and his mind is resistant to psychic powers. Kanto is a trained athlete and a fine hand-to-hand combatant. He is renowned as a master of weapons. And he is equally adept at the use of weapons of Earth's Italian Renaissance, such as swords, knives and at the use of the advanced technological weaponry created by the scientist of Apokolips. Except perhaps of Darkseid himself, Kanto is unequaled on Apokolips as a cunning strategist in devising methods of hunting and assassinating victims. He considers his work an art.

In other media

Television
 Kanto appeared in the Superman: The Animated Series episode "Tools of the Trade", voiced by Michael York. He supplied Intergang with weapons from Apokolips that they could use to kill Superman. After Intergang failed, Kanto retreated back to Apokolips with Bruno Mannheim desperately following him where Bruno ended up meeting Darkseid.
 Kanto later appears in the Justice League Unlimited episode "Alive", voiced by an uncredited Corey Burton. He along with Mantis serves as lieutenants for Virman Vundabar in his power struggle with Granny Goodness when Darkseid (following his death at the end of the Justice League episode "Twilight") returns putting an end to the war.
 Kanto appears in the Justice League Action episode "The Fatal Fare", voiced by Troy Baker. He and Desaad are planning an invasion on Earth when Superman stops them by placing a virus in their Mother Box that transports their ship to one of the planet's moons. When Darkseid arrives upon getting a ride from Space Cabbie, he assists Desaad in torturing Superman for the information on what virus was used on the Mother Box. Darkseid later has Space Cabbie take Kanto home. During the ride, Kanto states to Space Cabbie that he has been ordered to dispose of Space Cabbie on an acid lake planet. Space Cabbie tricks Kanto by taking him to Earth claiming that he should do the job on a planet filled with dangerous plants that the Green Lantern Corps declared were off-limits. Once on Earth, Kanto is defeated by Swamp Thing as Wonder Woman takes him away to drop him off at Belle Reve. In "Superman's Pal, Sid Sharp", Kanto assists Desaad, Granny Goodness, and Kalibak in luring Superman into a Kryptonite trap after the Parademons mistook Daily Bugle reporter Sid Sharp in a mock Superman outfit as Superman. When Superman falls into the Kryptonite trap, Kanto heads off to inform Darkseid that it worked only for Sid to trick the other three villains into competing with Kanto for the job. Upon Darkseid's arrival, Superman breaks free from the Kryptonite trap as he evades Darkseid, Desaad, Granny Goodness, Kalibak, and Kanto until he and Sid escape back to Earth using Desaad's Mother Box.

Video games
 Michael York reprised his role as Kanto in the video game Superman: Shadow of Apokolips.
 Kanto appears as a playable character in Lego DC Super-Villains, voiced by Corey Burton, and is the boss in the fifth and final bonus level "You Kanto-uch This". After Batman, Wonder Woman and Superman and The Flash find the way out of the base, Kanto is the last opponent they have to face, and throughout the fight, he constantly plays his guitar and keeps singing about how the heroes act and behave normally.

References

External links
 New Gods Library Profiles
 DCU Guide: Kanto chronology

DC Comics aliens
DC Comics characters with superhuman strength
DC Comics deities
DC Comics demons
DC Comics LGBT supervillains
Comics characters introduced in 1972
Fictional assassins in comics
New Gods of Apokolips
Characters created by Jack Kirby
Fourth World (comics)
Fictional gay males